John Newton Carey (born 11 July 1974) is an Australian politician. A member of the Australian Labor Party, Carey has been the member for Perth in the Western Australian Legislative Assembly, the lower house of the Parliament of Western Australia, since 11 March 2017. Since 19 March 2021, Carey has been the minister for housing and minister for local government. Since 21 December 2021, Carey has also been the minister for lands and minister for homelessness. From 19 October 2013 to 30 January 2017, he was the mayor of the City of Vincent.

Early life and career
John Newton Carey was born on 11 July 1974 in Perth, Western Australia. His parents were Delys and John William "Jack" Carey. Jack Carey was part of the 2/2nd Commando Squadron and took part in the Battle of Timor in World War II. Jack was awarded an Order of Australia medal in 2001 for his service to the welfare of veterans and their families and his assistance to the Timorese people through the 2/2nd Commando Association.

Carey studied at Murdoch University, where he graduated with a Bachelor of Arts with first class honours, majoring in communications. During his time at university, he was the national president of the National Union of Students.

In 2004, Carey joined the Australian Labor Party. He worked as a political advisor in the governments of Geoff Gallop and Alan Carpenter. After the 2008 state election, Carey worked for five years as the director of the Kimberley Conservation Project for the Pew Environment Group, where he successfully campaigned for the creation of the Great Kimberley Marine Park. For two years, he also ran an event, party and wedding coordination business called Bailey and Carey.

Carey established Western Australia's first "town team", the Beaufort Street Network, and co-founded the Beaufort Street Festival. He also founded the Brain Tumour Association of WA after his mother was diagnosed with glioblastoma.

City of Vincent
Carey was elected to the City of Vincent council in 2011. In his first term, he initiated a register for same-sex couples to register their relationship with the City of Vincent, in lieu of the federal government allowing same-sex marriage. He also criticised the state government's council merger plans, which would have resulted in the City of Vincent being split between the cities of Bayswater, Perth and Stirling. In 2013, he was elected mayor with 87.12% of the vote, succeeding Alannah MacTiernan, who had resigned as she had won the federal seat of Perth.

As Mayor of Vincent, Carey advocated for greater transparency and accountability in local government, writing and releasing a public discussion paper "Raising the Bar", and introduced a series of measures to enhance public reporting at the City of Vincent, including an online gifts register and WA's first contact with developers register.

During his tenure in 2016 with a new CEO at the helm and council, the City of Vincent was independently rated first among 25 councils, receiving an overall performance score of 82 out of 100, compared to 16th out of 18 councils in 2010. The Catalyse Community Scorecard surveys households across a local government area, and found the City of Vincent ranked highest in 18 out of 40 benchmarks, including place to live, governing organisation, and the city's leadership within the community.

Parliament
In March 2016, Carey confirmed that he was seeking preselection as the Labor Party candidate for the seat of Perth in the Western Australian Legislative Assembly, the lower house of the Parliament of Western Australia. The seat had been won by the Liberal Party's Eleni Evangel at the previous election. He said that residents were bringing to him issues that he could not solve at a local government level. He was officially preselected on 8 March. In December 2016, Carey announced his resignation as Mayor effective 30 January 2017. Stepping down ahead of the state election enabled the mayoral by-election to be held with the already-scheduled by-election to replace retiring councillor Laine McDonald. At the 2017 state election on 11 March, Carey was elected as the member for Perth, winning 61.8% of the two-party-preferred vote and a two-party-preferred swing of 14.6%.

From 17 March 2017 to 19 March 2021, Carey was parliamentary secretary to Mark McGowan, who was the premier, minister for public sector management, minister for state development, jobs and trade, and minister for federal-state relations. From 3 August 2017 to 19 March 2021, he was also parliamentary secretary to Rita Saffioti, who was the minister for transport, minister for planning and minister for lands (until 13 December 2018).

In August 2017, Carey hosted the Perth City Summit, which over 350 residents, business operators and property owners attended. The purpose was to discuss and develop projects and plans to improve Perth. Among the summit's recommendations are for a new university campus to be created in the Perth central business district, for new cycling infrastructure to be constructed and to remove alfresco fees for businesses.

At the 2021 state election on 13 March, Carey was re-elected as the member for Perth, winning 79.3% of the two-party-preferred vote and a two-party-preferred swing of 16.6%. Since 19 March 2021, Carey has been the minister for housing and minister for local government, succeeding Peter Tinley and David Templeman respectively. Since 21 December 2021, Carey has also been the minister for lands, succeeding Tony Buti, and the minister for homelessness, a newly created ministry. Responsibility for homelessness was previously held by the minister for community services. The CEO of Shelter WA, the state's peak group for ending homelessness, said "we know Minister Carey has been a passionate champion for homelessness during his time as the Member for Perth." The departments, agencies and offices under Carey's responsibility are the Department of Communities, Department of Planning, Lands and Heritage, Department of Local Government, Sport and Cultural Industries, Landgate, DevelopmentWA and the Metropolitan Cemeteries Board.

On 10 November 2021, Carey announced major reforms to local government in Western Australia. The proposed changes include making local government elections have preferential voting like at state and federal elections, as opposed to the currently used method of first-past-the-post voting; making larger local governments have directly elected mayors or presidents, as opposed to them being elected by councillors; a mandatory caretaker period before elections; livestreaming of council meetings online and posting of recordings; the formation of a local government inspector to investigate and fix dysfunctional councils in an attempt to avoid the need for expensive enquiries; further define the roles and responsibilities of councillors and local government CEOs; and new rules for the number of councillors for each local government. Legislation for this will be introduced to parliament in 2022.

As Lands Minister, Carey was responsible for the passage of the Wittenoom Closure Bill, which passed in March 2022. This allowed the government to permanently close the former town of Wittenoom by compulsorily acquiring the remaining private properties and removing all infrastructure from the town. The town had been declared a contaminated site due to asbestos mining, but several people still lived there and visited there. In September 2022, the last resident was evicted.

Political views
Carey is affiliated with the United Workers Union and is part of the Labor Left faction. He is a strong supporter of small business, and believes in reducing red tape for them.

Personal life
Carey is openly gay.

References

1974 births
Living people
Members of the Western Australian Legislative Assembly
21st-century Australian politicians
Australian Labor Party members of the Parliament of Western Australia
Mayors of places in Western Australia
Gay politicians
LGBT legislators in Australia
Labor Left politicians
Politicians from Perth, Western Australia
Murdoch University alumni
Western Australian local councillors